Sammallahti is a Finnish surname. Notable people with the surname include:

Heikki Sammallahti (1886–1954), gymnast
Pekka Sammallahti (born 1947), professor of Sámi languages
Pentti Sammallahti (born 1950), Finnish photographer, brother of Pekka

Finnish-language surnames